Franz Ries (Berlin, 7 April 1846 – Naumburg, 20 January 1932) was a Romantic German violinist and composer, son of Hubert Ries. He studied at the Paris Conservatory. He also worked in the publishing business.

Career
His talent formed under the direction of his father and in the Paris Conservatory under the violinist Joseph Massart, but after a short, brilliant career, he abandoned it suffering under a nerve problem, and settled in Dresden as a music retailer in 1875, where he still occasionally composed and performed on the violin. Then, from 1884 until his death, he lived as a co-owner of the company R. & Erler Berlin.

Compositions
Lieder, Op.1
 
Lieder, Op.3
 
Lieder, Op.4
 
 
String Quartet No.1 in D minor, Op.5 (publ. 1866)
 
 
 
 
(String Quartet No.2, Op.?)
6 Lieder, Op.6
3 Characterstücke, for Violin and Piano, Op.7
6 Lieder, Op.8
 Lieder, Op.10
 
Lieder, Op.12
 
 
Träumbilder (3 Klavierstücke), Op.13
3 Zweistimmige Gesänge, Op.14
3 Lieder, Op.16 (alto/baritone)
3 Lieder, Op.17
4 Romances, for Violin and Piano, Op.20 (publ. 1860)
 
 
 
 
4 Lieder, Op.25 (publ. 1876)
 
 
 
 
Kriegslied, Lied, Op.? (text Emanuel Geibel)
Suite No.I in G minor, for Violin and Piano, Op.26 (to Joseph Joachim - publ. 1877)
 
 
 
 
 
Suite No.II in F major, for Violin and Piano, Op.27 (publ. 1877)
 
 
 
 
 
String Quintet (for 2 violins, 2 violas and cello) in C minor, Op.28 (publ. 1878)
 
 
 
 
Dramatische Ouverture in E minor, for full Orchestra, Op.30 (publ. 1878)
6 Lieder, Op.31 (publ. 1879)
 
 
 
 
 
  
Suite No.III in G major, for Violin and Piano, Op.34 (publ. 1898)
 
 
 
 
 
Suite No.IV in D minor, for Violin and Piano, Op.38 (publ. 1890)
 
 
 
 
 
 
Lieder, Op.39
 
 
Lieder, Op.40
 
 
Lieder, Op.41
 
 
 
 
Tragödie, Lied Op.42
La Capricciosa, for Violin and Piano (to Ibolyka Gyarfas - publ. 1925)

Arrangements
Album-Blätter (Album leaves), "Melodies from Old Masters", 24 Pieces for Violin/Cello and Piano (arr. 1871-1884)
Book I (1-5):
 
 
 
 
 
Book II (6-10):
 
 
 
 
 
Book III (11-15):
 
 
 
 
 
Book IV (16-20):
 
 
 
 
 
Book V (21-24):

External links

1846 births
1932 deaths
19th-century classical composers
20th-century classical composers
German classical composers
German male classical composers
20th-century German composers
19th-century German composers
20th-century German male musicians
19th-century German male musicians